Io tu noi tutti (Me, you, all of us) is the tenth album by the Italian singer and songwriter Lucio Battisti. It was released in March 1977 by Numero Uno.

Recorded in Hollywood, the album was Italy's second best selling album in 1977.

Track listing 
All lyrics written by Mogol, all music composed by Lucio Battisti.
 "Amarsi un po'" (To Feel in Love) – 5:07
 "L'interprete di un film" (Star in a Film) – 4:28
 "Soli" (Lonely) – 4:18
 "Ami ancora Elisa" (You're Still in Love with Elisa) – 6:41
 "Sì, viaggiare" (Keep on Cruising) – 6:07
 "Questione di cellule" (Matter of Cells) – 4:16
 "Ho un anno di più" (The Only Thing I've Lost) – 5:04
 "Neanche un minuto di 'non amore'" (There's Never Been a Moment) – 5:20

References

1977 albums
Lucio Battisti albums
Albums produced by Bones Howe